El Factor X is the Colombian television music competition to find new singing talent. It is the based on the original British competition The X Factor, created by Simon Cowell. It is the first version produced in Latin America.

The show started screening in September 2005. The judges were Marbelle, singer Juan Carlos Coronel, and José Gaviria, a producer who has worked with stars like Carlos Santana. The winner was Julio César Meza. A second season followed in 2006 won by Francisco Villarreal and a third one, after a 2-year hiatus, in 2009 won by the duo Siam.

All the first three seasons and versions of the show have been hosted by the Colombian TV host and top model Andrea Serna, produced by Teleset and broadcast on RCN TV.

The show had two spin-offs. One was the one-year series El Factor X: Batalla de las Estrellas (meaning the Battle of the Stars). It was broadcast in 2006 and was won by Luz Amparo Álvarez.

The other-spin off was the series El Factor Xs for children up to 15 years. To date there have been three seasons with the same judges and presented by same host Andrea Serna. The first season was broadcast in 2006 and was won by Andres Hurtado, a second season in 2007 won by Camilo Echeverry and a third in 2011 won by Shaira Selena Peláez.

Season summary 

 "Juan Carlos Coronel"
 "José Gaviria"
 "Marbelle"
 "Piso 21" 
 "Rosanna" 
 "Carolina Gaitán"

Season 1 (2005) 

Participants and their respective mentors were:

The winner of season one was Julio César Meza from solo-singers-aged-25+ category; the runners-up were Enygma (group made up of Ricardo García, Manuel Peña, Germán ‘Tito’ Núñez and Iván Peña)  from vocal groups category and in third place was the controversial reggaeton-singer Farina (full name Pao Paucar Franco) from the solo-singers-aged-25-and-over category, famous for her quote Yo soy Farina! (from Spanish: I am Farina)

Season 2 (2006) 

The second season was won by Francisco Villarreal. He was unsuccessful contestant in the first season but had learned how to read in the intervening period. The runner up was Mario Marcelino Macuacé and third-place went to Angelo (full name Juan Carlos Ángel). Angelo was considered by many to be the favorite.

Season 3 (2009) 
After a hiatus of 2 years in which no more seasons were held, the program returned in 2009 with its third season. Big publicity campaign was held and Canal RCN and Teleset S.A., producers of the third series visited various cities to collect talents from all over the country. Judge mentors and the participants were:

The competition was won by the group Siam, with Raza Pana another group as runner-up and Jorge (full name Jorge Luis Medina Mosquera) as third.

El Factor X: Batalla de las Estrellas (2006) 
A "Battle of the Stars" celebrity version of the show was held only once in 2006. The winner of the celebrity series was Luz Amparo Alvarez.

Series Summary

 "Men" category
 "Women" category
 "Groups" category

El Factor Xs 
El Factor Xs is a popular children's version of the show that was made in early 2006. "Xs" stand for "extra small". A second season of "Xs" followed in 2007 and after a lapse of 4 years, a third season in 2011. The inaugural season was won by Andrés Camilo Hurtado, season 2 by Camilo Echeverry Correa, and the final season by Shaira Selena Pelaez.

Season summary 
(All winners in bold)

 "8-11 Years" category
 "12-15 Years" category
 "Groups" category

El Factor Xs Season 1 (2006)

El Factor Xs Season 2 (2007)

El Factor Xs Season 3 (2011)

See also 
List of Colombian TV Shows
The X Factor

External links 
Colombian El Factor X 2009 Official Site (Spanish)

Television series by Fremantle (company)
2005 Colombian television series debuts
2011 Colombian television series endings
Colombia
Non-British television series based on British television series
RCN Televisión original programming
Spanish-language television shows